A variety of health effects can result from tattooing . Because it requires breaking the skin barrier, tattooing carries inherent health risks, including infection and allergic reactions. Modern tattooists reduce such risks by following universal precautions, working with single-use disposable needles, and sterilising equipment after each use. Many jurisdictions require tattooists to undergo periodic bloodborne pathogen training, such as is provided through the Red Cross and the U.S. Occupational Safety and Health Administration.

Dermatologists have observed rare but severe medical complications from tattoo pigments in the body, and have noted that people acquiring tattoos rarely assess health risks prior to receiving their tattoos.  Some medical practitioners have recommended greater regulation of pigments used in tattoo ink. The wide range of pigments currently used in tattoo inks may create unforeseen health problems.

Infection 
Since tattoo instruments come in contact with blood and bodily fluids, diseases may be transmitted if the instruments are used on more than one person without being sterilised. However, infection from tattooing in clean and modern tattoo studios employing single-use needles is rare. With amateur tattoos, such as those applied in prisons, however, there is an elevated risk of infection. To address this problem, a programme was introduced in Canada as of the summer of 2005 that provides legal tattooing in prisons, both to reduce health risks and to provide inmates with a marketable skill. Inmates were to be trained to staff and operate the tattoo parlours once six of them opened successfully.

In the United States, the Red Cross prohibits a person who has received a tattoo from donating blood for 12 months (FDA 2000), unless the procedure was done in a state-regulated and licensed studio, using sterile technique. Not all states have a licensing program, meaning that people who receive tattoos in those states are subject to the 12-month deferral regardless of the hygienic standards of the studio. Similarly, the UK does not provide certification for tattooists, and blood donations are prohibited without exception for four months following a tattoo.

Infections that can theoretically be transmitted by the use of unsterilised tattoo equipment or contaminated ink include surface infections of the skin, hepatitis B, hepatitis C, tuberculosis, and HIV.  However, no person in the United States is reported to have contracted HIV via a commercially applied tattooing process. Washington state's OSHA studies have suggested that since the needles used in tattooing are not hollow, in the case of a needle stick injury the amount of fluids transmitted may be small enough that HIV would be difficult to transmit.  Tetanus risk is reduced by having an up-to-date tetanus booster prior to being tattooed. According to the Centers for Disease Control and Prevention, of 13,387 hepatitis cases in the USA in 1995, 12 cases (0.09%) were associated with tattoo parlours; by comparison, 43 cases (0.32%) were associated with dentists' offices.

In 2006, the CDC reported 3 clusters with 44 cases of methicillin-resistant staph infection traced to unlicensed tattooists.

Reactions to inks 

Perhaps due to the mechanism whereby the skin's immune system encapsulates pigment particles in fibrous tissue, tattoo inks have been described as "remarkably nonreactive histologically".  However, some allergic reactions have been medically documented.  No estimate of the overall incidence of allergic reactions to tattoo pigments exists.  Allergies to latex are apparently more common than to inks; many artists will use non-latex gloves when requested.  Tattoos may even trigger a positive immune response by strengthening it.

Allergic reactions to tattoo pigments, while uncommon, are most often seen with red, yellow, and occasionally white. Reactions can be triggered by exposure to sunlight. People who are sensitive or allergic to certain metals may react to pigments in the skin with swelling and/or itching, and/or oozing of clear fluid called serum. Such reactions are quite rare, however, and some artists will recommend performing a test patch. Because the mercury and Azo-chemicals in red dyes are more commonly allergenic than other pigments, allergic reactions are most often seen in red tattoos.  Less frequent allergic reactions to black, purple, and green pigments have also been noted. Tattoo inks contaminated with metal allergens have been known to cause severe reactions, sometimes years later, when the original ink is not available for testing; see metal allergy.

Traditional metallic salts are prevalent in tattoo inks. However, in 2005, there were no reports of metal toxicity from tattoo ink.
Organic pigments (i.e., non-heavy metal pigments) may also pose health concerns. A European Commission noted that close to 40% of organic tattoo colorants used in Europe had not been approved for cosmetic use, and that under 20% of colorants contained a carcinogenic aromatic amine.

MRI complications 
A few cases of burns on tattoos caused by MRI scans have been documented. Problems tend to occur with designs containing large areas of black ink, since black commonly contains iron oxide; the MRI scanner causes the iron to heat up either by inducing an electric current or hysteresis. Burning can occur on smaller tattoos such as "permanent makeup", but this is rare. Non-ferrous pigments have also been known to cause burns during an MRI.  It should be stressed that tattoo burns are rare, so merely having a tattoo does not contraindicate the use of MRI scanning.

Dermal conditions 

The most common dermal reactions to tattoo pigments are granulomas and various lichenoid diseases.  Other conditions noted have been cement dermatitis, collagen deposits, discoid lupus erythematosus, eczematous eruptions, hyperkeratosis and parakeratosis, and keloids.

Delayed reactions 
Hypersensitive reactions to tattoos are known to lay latent for significant periods of time before exhibiting symptoms. Delayed abrupt chronic reactions, such as eczematous dermatitis, are known to manifest themselves from months to as many as twenty years after the patient received their most recent tattoo.

Other adverse effects 
Other documented conditions caused by tattoo pigments have been carcinoma, hyperplasia, tumours, and vasculitis.  Keratoacanthoma may also occur, which makes excision of the affected area mandatory.  Eyeball tattoos carry their own unique risks.

Hematoma 
Occasionally, when a blood vessel is punctured during the tattooing procedure a hematoma (bruise) may appear. Bruises generally heal within one week. Bruises can appear as halos around a tattoo, or, if blood pools, as one larger bruise. This bluish or dark blurry halo that surrounds a tattoo can also be attributed to ink diffusion or 'blow-out'. Commonly mistaken for a hematoma, this discolouration occurs when tattoo pigments spread out into the subcutaneous tissue beneath the dermal skin layer, and may be caused by ink being deposited too deep in the skin.

Burden on lymphatic system 
Some pigment migrates from a tattoo site to lymph nodes, where large particles may accumulate.

Particles created by laser tattoo removal treatments may be small enough that they are carried away by the lymphatic system and excreted, but this is not always the case; the laser technology used for removal and the composition of the pigment(s) being removed are variable.

Interference with melanoma diagnosis 
Lymph nodes may become discolored and inflamed with the presence of tattoo pigments, but discoloration and inflammation are also visual indicators of melanoma; consequently, diagnosing melanoma in a patient with tattoos is made difficult, and special precautions must be taken to avoid misdiagnoses.

Effects of blood thinners 
A regimen of blood thinners may affect the tattooing process, causing excess bleeding.  This increased bleeding can slow the process of getting enough ink into the skin.  The aftercare healing may also take longer.

References

Case studies

Reactions to inks

Toxins in inks

Other dermatological reactions

MRI

Lymph nodes and melanoma 

Tattooing and medicine